The AquaDom (mixed Latin and German: 'water dome', more formally 'water cathedral') was a  cylindrical acrylic glass aquarium with built-in transparent elevator inside the Radisson Collection Hotel in the DomAquarée complex at Karl-Liebknecht-Straße in Berlin-Mitte, Germany. The DomAquarée complex also contains offices, a museum, a restaurant, and the Berlin Sea Life Centre aquarium. On 16 December 2022, the AquaDom aquarium ruptured, destroying itself and propelling the 1,500 fish inside into nearby streets, killing the majority of them.

Construction 
The AquaDom was opened on 2 December 2003 at a cost of about 12.8 million euros. The acrylic cylinder was manufactured by International Concept Management, Inc. using Reynolds Polymer Technology panels, with architecture drawings provided by Sergei Tchoban. It was located in the same building as the Berlin Sea Life attraction but was owned and operated by Union Investment.

The aquarium was constructed from 41 acrylic panels – 26 panels for the outside cylinder and 15 panels for the inside cylinder for the elevator – which were bonded together on site.

Operation 

To feed the fish,  of other fish were needed daily. Both the feeding and the cleaning of the tank were performed daily by a team of scuba divers.

In 2020, the aquarium was refurbished and upgraded, with all the water drained from the tank and the fish temporarily relocated to a breeding facility in the basement. According to the owner, seals were renewed at the base and an additional sealing level was fitted. The cylinder was repaired and polished in places. Maintenance work on the elevator was carried out.

Rupture and destruction 
The cylindrical tank burst at 5:45 am local time (4:45 am GMT) on 16 December 2022. Approximately  of water poured into the hotel and street, together with the 1,500 fish it hosted, devastating the interior of the hotel and eliciting a large-scale deployment of rescue workers. Two people were injured and hospitalized, with officials and the media noting that the collapse would have likely resulted in several fatalities had it taken place later in the day. The majority of the 1,500 fish were killed as a result.  Hundreds of smaller fish in the facility's breeding tanks were endangered as power was lost but they were successfully rescued.  The Technisches Hilfswerk (THW) rescue team completed their operation after 12 hours but the hotel's lobby and atrium remained devastated – "It looks like a battlefield".

The rush of salt water damaged several nearby businesses, including a Lindt chocolate shop, and was powerful enough to be detected by local seismographs.  Most of the seawater drained into the street's storm drains and sewers. The basement of the DDR Museum was also flooded and it is expected to remain closed for a few months. Sandra Weeser, a member of the Bundestag who was staying at the hotel at the time, described being woken up by "a kind of shock wave". There was no suspicion of foul play, with a spokesman for the owners of the tank stating the reason for the collapse was not yet clear.

Investigation 
Failures and major leaks have occurred at several large acrylic aquaria before, those accidents including the T-Rex Café at Disney Springs in Orlando and the Dubai Aquarium at the Dubai Mall.

References

External links 

 CityQuartier "DomAquarée"

Aquaria in Germany
Buildings and structures completed in 2003
2003 establishments in Germany
Buildings and structures in Mitte
Defunct aquaria
Tourist attractions in Berlin
Building collapses in 2022
Building collapses in Germany
Mechanical failure
2022 animal deaths